Maracaibo is a city and municipality in northwestern Venezuela, on the western shore of the strait that connects Lake Maracaibo to the Gulf of Venezuela. It is the second-largest city in Venezuela, after the national capital, Caracas, and the capital of the state of Zulia. The population of the city is approximately 2,658,355 with the metropolitan area estimated at 5,278,448 .
Maracaibo is nicknamed "The Beloved Land of the Sun".

Maracaibo is considered the economic center of western Venezuela, owing to the petroleum industry that developed in the shores of Lake Maracaibo. It is sometimes known as "The First City of Venezuela", for being the first city in Venezuela to adopt various types of public services, including electricity, as well as for being located in the shores of Lake Maracaibo, where the name of Venezuela allegedly originates.

Early indigenous settlements around the area were of Arawak and Carib origin. Maracaibo's founding date is disputed. There were failed attempts to found the city—in 1529, by Captain Ambrosio Ehinger, and in 1569, by Captain Alonso Pacheco. Founded in 1574 as Nueva Zamora de la Laguna de Maracaibo by Captain Pedro Maldonado, the city became a transshipment point for inland settlements after Gibraltar, at the head of the lake, had been destroyed by pirates in 1669. It was not until the first decades of the 17th century that the first town was settled. Petroleum was discovered in 1917, leading to a large increase in population from migration.

Maracaibo is served by La Chinita International Airport. The General Rafael Urdaneta Bridge connects Maracaibo to the rest of the country.

Etymology 

The name Maracaibo is said to come from the brave cacique (Indigenous chief) Mara, a young native who valiantly resisted the Spaniards and died fighting them. Legend says that when Mara fell, the Coquivacoa shouted "Mara kayó!" (Mara fell!), thus originating the city name—although it would be strange for them to shout in Spanish. Other historians say that the first name of this land in the local language was "Maara-iwo" meaning "Place where serpents abound".

History

Foundation
The first indigenous settlements were of Arawak and Carib origin. Around the main group were the Añu tribe who built rows of stilt houses all over the northern riviera of Lake Maracaibo. The first Europeans arrived in 1499.

The city was founded three times: the first time was during the Klein-Venedig period (1528–1546), when the Welser bankers of Augsburg received a concession over Venezuela Province from Charles I of Spain. In August 1529, the German Ambrosius Ehinger made his first expedition to Lake Maracaibo, which was bitterly opposed by the indigenous Coquivacoa. After winning a series of bloody battles, he founded the settlement on 8 September 1529. Ehinger named the settlement New Nuremberg and the lake after the valiant chieftain Mara of the Coquivacoa, who had died in the fighting. The city was renamed Maracaibo after the Spanish took possession. The lack of activity in the zone made Nikolaus Federmann evacuate the village in 1535 and move its population to Santa Marta near the then capital of Venezuela Province, Santa Ana de Coro.

A second attempt by Captain Alonso Pacheco in 1569 suffered a brief setback when the city had to be evacuated in 1573 due to ferocious attacks by native local tribes. The European settlement returned a short while later, in 1574, however, for which it was re-founded by Captain Pedro Maldonado under Governor Diego de Mazariegos's command and assuming the name of Nueva Zamora de Maracaibo. "Nueva Zamora" comes from Mazariego's place of birth, Zamora, in Spain. Since its definite foundation, the town began to develop as a whole. It is based on the western side of Lake Maracaibo, the dominant feature of the oil-rich Maracaibo Basin. Favored by prevailing winds and a protected harbour, the city is located on the shores of the lake where the narrows, which eventually lead to the Gulf of Venezuela, first become pronounced.

Pirate attacks
The Dutch corsair Henrik de Gerard plundered Maracaibo in 1614, and in 1642 the city was attacked by the British pirate William Jackson. In 1667, l'Olonnais with a fleet of eight ships and a crew of six hundred pirates sacked Maracaibo and Gibraltar. En route, l'Olonnais crossed paths with a Spanish treasure ship, which he captured, along with its rich cargo of cacao, gemstones and more than 260,000 pieces of eight.

In March 1669, Henry Morgan sacked Maracaibo, which emptied when his fleet was first spied, and moved on to the Spanish settlement of Gibraltar on the inside of Lake Maracaibo in search of more treasure. A few weeks later, when he attempted to sail out of the lake, Morgan found an occupied fort blocking the inlet to the Caribbean, along with three Spanish ships. These were the Magdalena, the San Luis, and the Soledad. He destroyed the Magdalena and burned the San Luis by sending a dummy ship full of gunpowder to explode near them, after which the crew of the Soledad surrendered. By faking a landward attack on the fort, thereby convincing the Spanish governor to shift his cannon, he eluded their guns and escaped.

In June 1678, Michel de Grammont, the French commander of six ships and 700 men, captured Maracaibo then followed the plundering of several smaller towns as Gibraltar, penetrating as far inland as Trujillo.

Venezuelan Independence 

In 1810, the province of Maracaibo did not join the First Republic of Venezuela and remained loyal to the Spanish crown. Maracaibo then held the seat of the Captaincy General of Venezuela.

In 1821, uprisings in favor of independence began to lead to warfare and hostility. The royalists, led by Francisco Tomás Morales, fought with the patriots, led by Rafael Urdaneta, to take back control over the province in the Juana de Ávila Battle, and Morales brought back Spanish rule in 1822 until he was defeated in the Battle of Lake Maracaibo on 24 July 1823, culminating Venezuela's struggle for independence.

Isolation period 
For about 380 years, Maracaibo remained isolated and separated from the rest of the country. Transportation to the vecinity was possible through the lake via boat and ferries. Commerce and culture flowed between Maracaibo and the Caribbean Sea, particularly the Dutch Antilles, colombian coastal cities, Cuba, Hispaniola and later on Miami, New York and Hamburg.

This isolation from the rest of Venezuela was both a challenge and an advantage. The very nature of the city's location made for a population known for their independent thought and character. The history of this region is rife with stories about the creation of an independent and sovereign nation apart from Venezuela, a nation called , 'the Independent Republic of Zulia', but this has never come to be.

Come the 20st century, cars, buses, and lorries, with their constant flow of manufactured goods and agricultural product to and from the city port, depended on ferry services between the city and the eastern shore which was poorly connected to the country's motorway system. Maracaibo and the Lake Maracaibo region's economy was more linked to Colombia and the Caribbean than to eastern Venezuela due to the natural route available through Lake Maracaibo then leading to the sea.

In January 1903, as the naval blockade of Venezuela continued during the negotiations with presidente Cipriano Castro, the German warship SMS Panther attempted to enter Lake Maracaibo, which was a center of German commercial activity. On 17 January, it exchanged fire with the settlement of Fort San Carlos, but withdrew after half an hour, as shallow waters prevented it getting close enough to the fort to be effective. The Venezuelans claimed this as a victory, and in response the German commander sent the SMS Vineta, with heavier weapons, to set an example. On 21 January, the Vineta bombarded the fort, setting fire to it and destroying it, with the death of 25 civilians in the nearby town.

In 1908, the Friesland, Gelderland and Jacob van Heemskerck
were sent to patrol the Venezuelan coast during the second Castro crisis. Friesland guarded the entry way to Maracaibo.

Building of the bridge 

The dictatorial regime of General Marcos Pérez Jiménez in the 1950s set as a goal the construction of a bridge connecting the two lake shores. Various bridge projects for the spanning of the Lake Maracaibo narrows near the city were in the works. The general's government had decided that this "city of independent thought" should be more "connected" to the rest of the country.

Proposals for a bridge design that included rail transport and tourist facilities were seriously considered. The fall of the Pérez Jiménez regime on January 23, 1958, quickly led to a less elaborate design project that was approved and funded by a democratic and more financially responsible government.

The project was completed on schedule in 40 months.

This bridge construction project was a remarkable feat. Built under very difficult conditions, when completed, it became the longest prestressed concrete bridge in the world. The structure is in constant use and remains today as the most important link between Maracaibo, along with much of the state of Zulia, and the rest of Venezuela.

Modern times 
Perspective
François de Pons, an agent to the French government in Caracas, provides some historical insight into the people of Maracaibo in his travel journal . The following excerpts describe the local population of Maracaibo:

"They perform coasting, or long voyages, with equal facility; and when all trade is suspended by the operations of war, they enter privateers. Bred up in the neighbourhood of the lake, they are mostly all expert swimmers and excellent divers. Their reputation stands equally high as soldiers. Those who do not enter into the sea service, form plantations, or assist in cultivating those that belong to their fathers. Nothing proves better their aptitude for this kind of occupation, than the immense flocks of cattle with which the savannas of Maracaybo  are covered."

He also notes the appreciation of literature, the arts, education, and culture among the people of Maracaibo:

"But what confers the greatest honour on the inhabitants of Maracaibo, is their application to literature; in which, notwithstanding the wretched state of public education, they make considerable progress....They likewise acquired the art of elocution, and of writing their mother tongue with the greatest purity; in a word, they possessed all the qualities that characterise men of letters."

Maracaibo has become a large metropolitan city, comprising two municipalities: the municipality of Maracaibo proper, and the municipality of San Francisco, established in 1995, to the south. In recent years, due to political/economic and cultural reasons, many have moved to Maracaibo from rural areas and other cities (including Caracas).

Maracaibo also boasts one of the best universities in the country, the state university, La Universidad del Zulia (LUZ) is well renowned for its excellent law, medical and engineering schools as many other disciplines. Other universities and schools include Universidad Dr. Rafael Belloso Chacín (URBE) and Universidad Rafael Urdaneta, with one of the country's leading psychology schools.
The Diocese of Maracaibo (23 July 1965) was elevated to Archdiocese on 30 April 1966 by Pope Paulus VI. Maracaibo was visited by Pope John Paul II in 1985. Since November 2000, its Archbishop has been Ubaldo Ramón Santana Sequera.

Economy
Zulia's main income comes from oil extraction and refining, agriculture (coffee, rice, maize, cassava, cocoa, sugar cane),
livestock production, and mining (clay, limestone, coal and sand).

Geography

Location 
The municipality of Maracaibo is divided into 18 parishes as follows:

Climate
Maracaibo is one of the hottest cities of Venezuela and all of South America as well. The rain shadow of the Sierra Nevada de Santa Marta gives the city a semiarid climate (Köppen: BSh) bordering tropical savanna climate (Köppen: Aw) 
In the past, the climate of the city, indeed all along the coast of Lake Maracaibo, was unhealthy due to the combination of high temperatures with high humidity. Today, control of plagues and the effects of urban development has largely eradicated these health problems.

Education

Colleges and universities 
Several universities are based in the city:
 Universidad del Zulia - (LUZ)
 Universidad Nacional Experimental de la Fuerza Armada UNEFA
 Universidad Rafael Belloso Chacín - (URBE)
 Universidad Rafael Urdaneta
 Universidad Católica Cecilio Acosta
 Universidad Dr. José Gregorio Hernández
 Universidad Bolivariano de Venezuela sede Zulia
 Universidad Nacional Abierta (UNA) Centro Local Zulia

International schools

 Escuela Bella Vista (American school)
 Colegio Alemán de Maracaibo, formerly Colegio Alemán del Zulia (German school)

Sports 

Due to the regionalistic nature of Marabinos, they strongly support their native teams. Maracaibo, and the rest of Zulia, are represented in baseball by the Águilas del Zulia, a Venezuelan winter league team that plays in the Liga Venezolana de Béisbol Profesional, and is based in the Estadio Luis Aparicio El Grande. The city's basketball team is Gaiteros del Zulia, which plays in the Liga Profesional de Baloncesto de Venezuela. Its home is the 5.000-people Pedro Elías Belisario Aponte stadium. Other teams include the Unión Atlético Maracaibo and the Zulia FC in football, the Maracaibo Rugby Football Club and the Zulianos Rugby Club.

In the 2000 Little League World Series, the Sierrra Maestra Little League of Maracaibo, Venezuela defeated Bellaire Little League of Bellaire, Texas in the championship game of the 54th Little League World Series. The Coquivocoa Little League team from Maracaibo placed third in the 1974 Little League World Series.

Rugby in Venezuela was first played in Maracaibo, thanks to the influence of the English community based on the Zulia State

Team:
 Baseball: Águilas del Zulia BBC.
 Basketball: Gaiteros del Zulia
 Soccer: Unión Atlético Maracaibo, Zulia FC
 Rugby: Maracaibo Rugby Football Club "Oil Blacks", Zulianos Rugby Club

Culture 

Culture in Maracaibo maintains strong Indigenous influences, from its gaitas, desserts, style, and other customs. Most major houses of advertising in Venezuela acknowledge how different the culture of Maracaibo is from that of Caracas. Studies of both prove, for example, that Caracas' leading soft drink brand is Coke, while in Maracaibo it is Pepsi. This has made many brands create special localized advertising of their products (including several Pepsi commercials spoken by local celebrities).

The Gaita is a style of Venezuelan folk music from Maracaibo. According to Joan Corominas, it may come from gaits, the Gothic word for "goat", which is the skin generally used for the membrane of the "furro" instrument. Other instruments used in gaita include maracas, cuatro, charrasca and tambora (Venezuelan drum). Song themes range from humorous and love songs to protest songs.The style became popular throughout Venezuela in the 1960s, and it fused with other styles such as salsa and merengue in the 1970s. Famous gaita groups include Maracaibo 15, Gran Coquivacoa, Barrio Obrero, Cardenales del Éxito, Koquimba, Melody Gaita, Guaco, Estrellas del Zulia, Saladillo, and many others.

Museums, cultural centers and theaters 

 Zulia Contemporary Art Museum (MACZUL)
 General Rafael Urdaneta Museum
 "Balmiro León" Municipal Graphic Arts Museum
 Maracaibo's Fine Arts Centre
 Maracaibo's "Lía Bermúdez" Art Centre
 Baralt Theatre
Museum of Gaita

Libraries 
 Public Library of Zulia
 "Arturo Uslar Pietri" Public Library
 "Dr. Pedro Alciro Barboza de la Torre" Library
 "Simón Palmar" Public Library
 Biblioteca Pública "Luís Guillermo Pineda Belloso" (De carácter público, bilingüe y circulante)
 "Pedagógica" Specialized Public Library
 "SEDINI" Specialized Public Library
"Dr. Nectario Andrade Labarca" Private Library

Notable people 
 Teolindo Acosta - baseball player
 José Andrés Martínez - professional MLS soccer player
 Gustavo Aguado - musician, singer and leader of Guaco music band
 Ricardo Aguirre - composer and singer
 Daniel Alvarado - singer and actor
 Wilson Álvarez - Major League Baseball left-handed pitcher
 Ernesto Aparicio - former shortstop in Venezuelan League Baseball
 Luis Aparicio - shortstop Major League Baseball Hall of Fame
 Rafael Maria Baralt - diplomat, writer, philologist, historian
 Huascar Barradas - flutist
 Lionel Belasco - pianist, composer and bandleader, best known for his calypso recordings
 Marisela Berti - actress, singer, show host and beauty queen
 José Bracho - baseball pitcher
 Silvino Bracho - baseball pitcher
 Antonio Briñez - first manager to win a National Amateur Baseball championship to Venezuela
 María Calcaño - poet
 José Antonio Casanova - baseball player and team manager
 Abel Castellano Jr. - jockey
 Javier Castellano - jockey Eclipse Award 2013, 2014, 2015, 2016. Hall of Fame
 Gustavo Chacín - Major League Baseball pitcher for the Toronto Blue Jays
 Johana Clavel - cook and entrepreneur
 Gilberto Correa - TV host
 David Cubillan - basketball player, Marquette University
 Chiquinquirá Delgado - actress and TV host
 Xabier Elorriaga- actor
 Heraclio Fernández - pianist and composer
 Lupita Ferrer - actress
 Juan Fuenmayor - soccer player
Manuel Gogorza- militar
 Betulio González - boxer
 Carlos González - Major League Baseball outfielder for the Colorado Rockies
 Geremi González - Major League Baseball player for several teams
 Inés González Árraga - chemist and former political prisoner
 Mariana González Parra - fencer
 Ulises Hadjis- singer-songwriter and multi instrumentalist
 Alejandro Hernández - Internet comedian
 Jonathan Herrera - second baseman for the Colorado Rockies
 Wilmer Herrison - painter
 Ender Inciarte - baseball player
 Ninibeth Leal - Miss Venezuela World 1991, Miss World 1991
 Sandy León - baseball player
 Carlos López Bustamante - journalist, known for his opposition to Juan Vicente Gómez
 Eduardo López Bustamante - journalist, lawyer, and poet
 Teresa López Bustamante - journalist, founder of the Catholic Venezuelan newspaper
 Eduardo López Rivas - editor and journalist
 Tulio Enrique León - blind organist, composer, and arranger
 Sandy Leon- Major League Baseball catcher for the Boston Red Sox
 Betty Cecilia Lugo - Philanthropist
 Michael McKinley - ambassador of USA
 Julio Machado - Major League Baseball pitcher
 Carlos Ramírez MacGregor - journalist, politician and writer
 Domingo Marcucci - shipbuilder and shipowner in San Francisco, California
 Ernesto Mayz Vallenilla - philosopher, rector of Simón Bolívar University (Venezuela)
 Armando Molero - songwriter
 Carlos Molina Tamayo - navy militar
 Ricardo Montaner - Venezuelan Musician
 Carmen Maria Montiel - Miss Venezuela 1984, Miss Universe 1984 2nd runner up
 Carlos Caridad-Montero - film producer
 Humberto Fernández Morán - research scientist, founded the Venezuelan scientific research institute
 Lila Morillo - actress and singer
 Francisco Ochoa - first President of the Universidad del Zulia
 Rougned Odor - second baseman for the Baltimore Orioles
 Gastón Parra Luzardo- Economist president of PDVSA in 2002
 Gerardo Parra- Baseball outfielder player of MLB
 Nestor Perez Luzardo- lawyer and singer
 Felipe Pirela- singer
 Nick Pocock - former cricketer, ex-captain of Hampshire County Cricket Club
 Oswaldo Álvarez Paz - First elected Governor
 L. Rafael Reif - electrical engineer and the 17th President of the Massachusetts Institute of Technology
 Graciela Rincón Calcaño - poet
 Rafael Romero Sandrea - track and field athlete
 Daniel Sarcos - Telemundo TV host
Jefferson Savarino - footballer
 Monica Spear - Miss Venezuela 2004, Miss Universe 2005 4th runner up, actress
 Orlando Urdaneta - actor
 Rafael Urdaneta - hero of the Latin American war for independence
 Vivian Urdaneta - Miss Venezuela International 2000, Miss International 2000
 Patricia Van Dalen - painter
 Patricia Velásquez - actress and international top model
 Leonardo Villalobos - actor and television personality

Districts

International relations

Twin towns – Sister cities
Maracaibo is twinned with:

 Bremen, Germany
 Durban, South Africa
 Honolulu, United States
 New Orleans, United States
 Ploiești, Romania
 Istanbul, Turkey

Skyline

References

Further reading

External links

 Panorama Digital - Largest Maracaibo based newspaper
 La Verdad - Maracaibo-based newspaper

 
Cities in Zulia
Municipalities of Zulia
Lake Maracaibo
Port cities in the Caribbean
Port cities in Venezuela
Populated places established in 1529
Ports and harbours of Venezuela